Mark L. Johnson (born 24 May 1949 in Kansas City, Missouri) is Knight Professor of Liberal Arts and Sciences in the Department of Philosophy at the University of Oregon.  He is known for contributions to embodied philosophy, cognitive science and cognitive linguistics, some of which he has coauthored with George Lakoff such as Metaphors We Live By.  However, he has also published on philosophical topics such as John Dewey, Immanuel Kant and ethics.

Bibliography
 Morality for Humans: Ethical Understanding from the Perspective of Cognitive Science, University of Chicago Press, 2014.
 The Meaning of the Body: Aesthetics of Human Understanding, University of Chicago Press, 2007.
  Philosophy in the Flesh: The Embodied Mind and Its Challenge to Western Thought (coauthored with George Lakoff), Basic Books, 1999.
  Moral Imagination: Implications of Cognitive Science for Ethics, University of Chicago Press, 1993.
  The Body in the Mind: The Bodily Basis of Meaning, Imagination, and Reason, University of Chicago Press, 1987.
 Philosophical Perspectives on Metaphor, University of Minnesota, 1981.
 Metaphors We Live By (coauthored with George Lakoff), University of Chicago Press, 1980; revised 2003.

See also
Aesthetics
American philosophy
Cognitive neuroscience
Cognitive semantics
Conceptual blending
Embodied cognition
Embodied cognitive science
Enactivism
List of American philosophers
Neurophenomenology
Philosophy of mind
Situated cognition

References

Other sources
  "We Are Live Creatures: Embodiment, American Pragmatism, and the Cognitive Organism" (co-author, Tim Rohrer) (Link is to archived final pre-press draft.)  In Body, Language, and Mind, vol. 1. Zlatev, Jordan; Ziemke, Tom; Frank, Roz; Dirven, René (eds.). Berlin: Mouton de Gruyter, 2007.

External links
Mark Johnson's homepage
University of Oregon Department of Philosophy
The Meaning of the Body: Aesthetics of Human Understanding (video, 1:27:52)

1949 births
20th-century American essayists
20th-century American male writers
20th-century American philosophers
20th-century linguists
21st-century American essayists
21st-century American male writers
21st-century American philosophers
21st-century linguists
American ethicists
Linguists from the United States
American male essayists
American male non-fiction writers
American philosophy academics
Analytic philosophers
Communication theorists
American consciousness researchers and theorists
Epistemologists
Fellows of the Cognitive Science Society
Kant scholars
Literacy and society theorists
Living people
Metaphor theorists
Motivation theorists
Persuasion theorists
Philosophers of art
Philosophers of linguistics
Philosophers of mind
Philosophers of science
Philosophy writers
Rhetoric theorists
Southern Illinois University faculty
Theorists on Western civilization
Trope theorists
University of Chicago alumni
University of Oregon faculty